Gargi is a 2022 Indian Tamil-language legal drama film directed and co-written by Gautham Ramachandran and produced by Blacky, Genie & My Left Foot Productions. Co-written by Hariharan Raju Sai Pallavi and Kaali Venkat are cast in the lead roles. The film's music is composed by Govind Vasantha with cinematography handled by Sraiyanti and Premkrishna Akkatu and editing done by Shafique Mohamed Ali. Gargi was released on 15 July 2022 and received critical acclaim from critics who praised the cast performances, the script, the direction, and the social message.

Plot 
Gargi is a school teacher from a struggling family consisting of her dad Brahmanandam who works as a security guard in an apartment building, her mom who sells homemade rice batter and her younger sister Akshara who's in middle school. Their life becomes chaos when dad is accused along with 4 other men of having assaulted a child. Gargi is steadfast in her resolve to prove her dad's innocence, as he's her hero, having protected her as a child from a perverted teacher, encouraging her to stand up to such evil.

At the receiving end of public hatred, they're abandoned even by a family friend who's a successful lawyer. But his assistant, a no-note lawyer, Indrans Kaliaperumal, agrees to represent them as he has no reputation to lose. At the hearing, while questioning the investigating officer, Indrans uncovers that the victim was wrongly medicated with a high dose of barbiturates, thus rendering her testimony (identifying Brahmanandam as the culprit) inadmissible.

Further, he meets the victim's dad, who reveals that it was he who made her identify Brahmanandam (certain of his guilt), as she was catatonic with trauma, unable to function at all. All this puts into question the evidence, thus enabling him to obtain conditional bail for Brahmanandam.

When her dad's colleague, who had earlier claimed to have been at home all day on the fateful day, inadvertently reveals that he, in a drunken stupor, had actually been the first to discover the child lying there, and had alerted Brahmanandam, Gargi starts doubting her dad's claims that he'd been drinking at that time. She confirms her suspicions by visiting the child again and showing her a picture of the 5th culprit.

It's revealed, when the child identifies him, that Brahmanandam was indeed the culprit, leading to his arrest and conviction. Gargi takes a moment outside, to quietly come to terms with this horror. As the credits roll, we discover that she and her family have moved on, having reconciled with the victim and her dad.

Cast

Production 
Jyothika was supposed to do the lead female role.she  was replaced by Sai Pallavi.The film was announced on 9 May 2022 with the makers releasing a special glimpse of the film.

Music 
The film's soundtrack is composed by Govind Vasantha while lyrics are written by Karthik Netha.

Release

Theatrical 
Gargi was released theatrically worldwide on 15 July 2022.

Home media 
The post-theatrical rights of the film was sold to SonyLIV, while the satellite rights of the film is sold to Kalaignar TV.

Reception

Critical response 
Gargi received positive reviews from critics who praised the cast performances, the script, the direction, and the social message.

The Times of India rated the film 4 out of 5 stars and wrote, "A superbly shot, hard-hitting drama that unfolds more like a tense thriller, Gautham Ramachandran's Gargi is an essential film in this #MeToo era." The Indian Express also rated the film 4 out of 5 stars and wrote, "Sai Pallavi and Kaali Venkat bring their best to a challenging drama about crime, punishment and justice system." Praising Sai Pallavi's performance, The Hindu wrote,  "This is probably Sai Pallavi's best performance till date... It's a wholesome performance that few actresses have given in recent times." Cinema Express rated the film 4.5 out of 5 stars and stated that "Nevertheless, these are minor misgivings in this film about many underdogs. Gargi stands by many such people. It stands by its transwoman judge, who is at the receiving end of sly digs. It stands by its stuttering amateur lawyer, who, when stressed, struggles to make an argument. And above all, it stands by its women. You see this never more than when the film doesn’t end with Gargi seeing her father’s case through to a resolution. It ends with her own transformation."

References

External links 

2020s legal drama films
2022 films
Indian legal drama films